Wolfgang Dremmler (born 12 July 1954) is a German former footballer who played as a midfielder.

A trained metalworker, Dremmler was part of the West Germany team that reached the 1982 FIFA World Cup final against Italy at Santiago Bernabéu. Altogether, he played in 310 Bundesliga matches (15 goals) for Eintracht Braunschweig and FC Bayern Munich, the club he joined in 1979 at the recommendation of Paul Breitner to win four Bundesliga and three German Cup trophies until his retirement due to a knee-injury in 1986. For West Germany he debuted on 7 January 1981 in a game against Brazil. In total he won 27 caps (three goals) for his country.

Dremmler retired from coaching in football at the end of the 2016–17 season. Dremmler's last job was the director of Bayern's youth development center.

Honours

Club
Bayern Munich
 Bundesliga: 1979–80, 1980–81, 1984–85, 1985–86
 DFB-Pokal: 1981–82, 1983–84, 1985–86; runner-up: 1984–85
 European Cup runner-up: 1981–82

International
West Germany
 FIFA World Cup runner-up: 1982

References

External links
 
 
 

1954 births
German footballers
Germany international footballers
Germany B international footballers
Living people
Eintracht Braunschweig players
FC Bayern Munich footballers
1982 FIFA World Cup players
Bundesliga players
People from Salzgitter
Footballers from Lower Saxony
FC Bayern Munich non-playing staff
Association football midfielders
West German footballers